Beach Soccer Intercontinental Cup 2022 was the 11th edition of the Beach Soccer Intercontinental Cup, an annual international beach soccer tournament contested by men's national teams. This year's event occurred between 1 and 6 November 2022 in Dubai, United Arab Emirates. The tournament is organised by the Dubai Sports Council (DSC) and Beach Soccer Worldwide (BSWW).

The Intercontinental Cup is typically seen as the biggest tournament in the current international beach soccer calendar after the FIFA Beach Soccer World Cup. Similar in nature to that of the FIFA Confederations Cup, eight nations took part.

The tournament starts with a round robin group stage. The winners and runners-up from each group advance to the knockout stage, a series of single-elimination matches, beginning with the semi-finals and ending with the final. Consolation matches are also played to determine other final rankings.

The season-ending Beach Soccer Stars awards are also presented in Dubai as a conclusion to the tournament.

Russia is defending champions but they were absent in this event.

Participating teams
The following eight teams took part.

Group stage
Matches are listed as local time in Dubai, GST (UTC+4)

Group A

Group B

5th–8th place play-offs
The teams finishing in third and fourth place are knocked out of title-winning contention, receding to play in consolation matches to determine 5th through 8th place in the final standings.

5th–8th place semi-finals

Seventh place play-off

Fifth place play-off

Knockout stage

Semi finals

Third place play-off

Final

Awards

Winners trophy

Statistics

Goalscorers

Final standings

References

External links
Intercontinental Beach Soccer Cup Dubai 2022, at Beach Soccer Worldwide

Beach Soccer Intercontinental Cup
Beach Soccer Intercontinental Cup
International association football competitions hosted by the United Arab Emirates
Intercontinental Cup
Beach Soccer Intercontinental Cup